The 77th World Science Fiction Convention (Worldcon), also known as Dublin 2019—An Irish Worldcon, was held on 15–19 August 2019 at the Convention Centre, as well as in The Point Square, Dublin, Ireland.

The convention chair was James Bacon.

Participants 

Attendance was 6,525, out of 8,430 paid memberships.

Guests of Honour 

 academic Jocelyn Bell Burnell
 editor Ginjer Buchanan
 fans Mary and Bill Burns
 author Diane Duane
 game designer Steve Jackson
 author Ian McDonald

Special Guests 

 engineer and astronaut Jeanette Epps
 engineer and astronaut-candidate Norah Patten

Featured artists 

 comics and graphic novel artist Afua Richardson
 Celtic tradition artist Jim Fitzpatrick
 multimedia artist Maeve Clancy
 comics and graphic novel artist Sana Takeda

Other notable participants 

In addition to several Guests of Honour, a number of Featured Artists appeared on the convention programme: Jim Fitzpatrick, Maeve Clancy, Afua Richardson and Sana Takeda.

Programming and events 

The convention took place in two main locations - the Convention Centre Dublin, and the Odeon Theatre at Point Square. In addition to the main programming, a number of fringe events took place around the city, in the Science Gallery, Irish Film Institute, the Fishamble Theatre, and Fairview Park.

Awards 

Dublin 2019 announced that there would be a special Hugo category for "Best Art Book". The awards were announced at the convention on 19 August.

2019 Hugo Awards 

3,097 ballots were cast for the 2019 Hugo Awards, of which 3,089 were online ballots and 8 were paper ballots. The winners were:

 Best Novel: The Calculating Stars by Mary Robinette Kowal
 Best Novella: Artificial Condition by Martha Wells
 Best Novelette: "If at First You Don't Succeed, Try, Try Again" by Zen Cho
 Best Short Story: "A Witch's Guide to Escape: A Practical Compendium of Portal Fantasies" by Alix E. Harrow
 Best Series: Wayfarers by Becky Chambers
 Best Related Work: Archive of Our Own, a project of the Organization for Transformative Works
 Best Graphic Story: Monstress, Volume 3, written by Marjorie Liu, art by Sana Takeda
 Best Dramatic Presentation, Long Form: Spider-Man: Into the Spider-Verse, screenplay by Phil Lord and Rodney Rothman; directed by Bob Persichetti, Peter Ramsay, and Rodney Rothman
 Best Dramatic Presentation, Short Form: The Good Place: "Janet(s)" written by Josh Siegal & Dylan Morgan, directed by Morgan Sackett
 Best Professional Editor, Long Form: Navah Wolfe
 Best Professional Editor, Short Form: Gardner Dozois
 Best Professional Artist: Charles Vess
 Best Semiprozine: Uncanny Magazine, edited by Lynne M. Thomas and Michael Damian Thomas, managing editor Michi Trotta
 Best Fanzine: Lady Business, edited by "Ira, Jodie, KJ, Renay & Susan"
 Best Fancast: Our Opinions Are Correct, hosted by Annalee Newitz and Charlie Jane Anders
 Best Fan Writer: Foz Meadows
 Best Fan Artist: Likhain (Mia Sereno)
 Best Art Book: The Books of Earthsea: The Complete Illustrated Edition, illustrated by Charles Vess, written by Ursula K. Le Guin

Other awards 

 Lodestar Award for Best Young Adult Book: Children of Blood and Bone, by Tomi Adeyemi
 John W. Campbell Award for Best New Writer: Jeannette Ng, for Under the Pendulum Sun

Following Jeannette Ng's acceptance speech of the award for Best New Writer, in which she called out Campbell's politics, referring to him as a "fascist", the publishers of Analog magazine announced that the John W. Campbell Award for Best New Writer would immediately be renamed to "The Astounding Award for Best New Writer".

Site selection 

Dublin in 2019 was the only bid which officially filed to host the 77th World Science Fiction Convention, and its selection was confirmed by vote of the members of the 75th World Science Fiction Convention in Helsinki.

See also 

 Hugo Award
 Science fiction
 Speculative fiction
 World Science Fiction Society
 Worldcon

References

External links 

 
 
 Dublin in 2019 bid site
 List of current Worldcon bids

2019 conferences
Science fiction conventions in Europe
Worldcon